"Stop for a Minute" is the only single from Keane's 2010 EP, and fourth record, Night Train. The song marks Keane's collaboration with Somali-Canadian rapper, K'naan. The single was released on 5 April 2010 in the United Kingdom and on 11 April 2010 in the United States. The song is featured on the soundtrack of Pro Evolution Soccer 2011.

Music video
The video begins with shots of a Bethnal Green Road, London. Keane frontman Tom Chaplin and K'naan are shown singing in the bar while surrounded by patrons enjoying their night, a contrast to some of the song's lyrics.

Track listing

Charts
The song debuted at number forty on the UK Singles Charts, making their tenth top-forty hit and their highest chart single since Spiralling.

Weekly charts

Year-end charts

Release history

References

Keane (band) songs
K'naan songs
2010 singles
Songs written by Tim Rice-Oxley
Songs written by Tom Chaplin
Songs written by Richard Hughes (musician)
Song recordings produced by Fraser T. Smith
2010 songs
Island Records singles
Songs written by K'naan